Epifanie Norocel (December 14, 1932 – January 7, 2013) was the Romanian Orthodox metropolitan bishop of Buzǎu and Vrancea, Romania. He was ordained a bishop in 1975.

He was born in Mălini, Suceava County, and died in Panciu, Vrancea County.

Notes

1932 births
2013 deaths
People from Suceava County
Romanian Orthodox metropolitan bishops